Bashful is a 1917 American short comedy film featuring Harold Lloyd. A copy exists in the film archive of the Museum of Modern Art, New York City.

Plot
Harold plays a shy but well-off bachelor who has been invited to a party hosted by The Girl (Bebe Daniels). While there, Harold receives a telegram informing him that he is about to inherit a fortune from a distant and recently deceased aunt—provided he is married and has a baby. The Girl agrees to act as his wife when his uncle arrives to inspect their household. Harold's valet (Snub) procures an entire room full of toddlers to play the role of the couple's child—including a black infant. His uncle sees the numerous children. Instead of being suspicious, since Harold claims he's only been married for two years, his uncle hands him the check and says he will certainly need the money.

Cast

 Harold Lloyd as Harold
 Snub Pollard as Snub, Harold's butler (credited as Harry  Pollard)
 Bebe Daniels as "The Girl"
 Bud Jamison
 William Blaisdell
 James Morrison
 Sammy Brooks
 Billy Fay (credited as William Fay)
 William Gillespie
 Max Hamburger
 Annette Hatten (credited as Annette Hatton)
 Oscar Larson
 Maynard Laswell (credited as M.A. Laswell)
 Gus Leonard
 M.J. McCarthy
 Belle Mitchell
 Fred C. Newmeyer
 Evelyn Page (credited as Evelyn Paige)
 Hazel Powell
 Nina Speight
 Charles Stevenson
 William Strohbach (credited as William Strawback)

Reception
Like many American films of the time, Bashful was subject to cuts by city and state film censorship boards. The Chicago Board of Censors required a cut of the last hula dance scene.

See also
 List of American films of 1917
 Harold Lloyd filmography

References

External links

 Film still of Harold Lloyd and Bebe Daniels

1917 films
1917 short films
American silent short films
1917 comedy films
American black-and-white films
Films directed by Alfred J. Goulding
Silent American comedy films
American comedy short films
1910s American films